Padarli is a village in Ahore tehsil of Jalore District of Rajasthan state in India. It is situated near the town Takhatgarh.

Demographics
Population of Padarli is 3469 according to census 2011. The male population is 1713 and the female population is 1756.

References

Villages in Jalore district